Eric Burdon was a lead vocalist with The Animals, War, and other bands.

Studio albums
With The Animals, Eric Burdon & The Animals, The Original Animals use the link below.

Eric Burdon & War
 Eric Burdon Declares "War" – 1970, No. 18 US, No. 47 in US Black Albums, No. 50 in UK, No. 7 in AUS, No. 11 in CAN, No. 14 in GER
 The Black-Man's Burdon (double album) – 1970, No. 80 US, No. 17 in AUS, No. 38 in CAN, No. 20 in GER
 Love Is All Around – 1976, No. 140 US
Eric Burdon & Jimmy Witherspoon
Guilty! – 1971 (Re-released in 1976 as "Black & White Blues")
The Eric Burdon Band
 Sun Secrets – 1974, No. 51 US, No. 84 in CAN
 Stop – 1975, No. 171 US, No. 85 in CAN
 Comeback – 1982
Eric Burdon
 Survivor – 1977
 Darkness Darkness – 1980
 The Last Drive – 1980
 Power Company – 1983
 I Used To Be An Animal – 1988
 American Dream – 1993
 Lost Within the Halls of Fame – 1995
 My Secret Life – 2004, No. 93 in DE
 Soul of a Man – 2006, No. 43 in DE, No. 165 in FR
 Mirage – 2008 
 Eric Burdon & The Greenhornes – 2012
 'Til Your River Runs Dry – 2013, No. 57 in DE

Live albums
 1965 – In The Beginning
 1973 – The Animals with Sonny Boy Williamson
 1984 – Rip It To Shreds: Greatest Hits Live, No. 195 in US
 1985 – That's Live
 1993 – Access All Areas*
 1996 – Eric Burdon Live
 1998 – Live at the Roxy
 2000 – The Official Live Bootleg #1
 2000 – The Official Live Bootleg #2
 2001 – The Official Live Bootleg 2000
 2002 – Live in Seattle 2002
 2005 – Athens Traffic Live*
 2009 – Live 17th October 1974

* indicates an album that contains both live and studio tracks

Compilations

1966   The Best of the Animals, No. 6 in US
1966   The Most of Animals (UK), No. 4 in UK
1967   The Best of Eric Burdon & The Animals, Vol. II, No. 71 in US
1969   The Greatest Hits of Eric Burdon and The Animals, No. 153 in US
1971   The Most of Animals, No. 18 in UK
1973   The Best of The Animals (double album), No. 188 in US
1973   Starportrait, No. 36 in GER
1976   Mad Man
1980   Eric Burdon and the Animals
1982   Eric Burdon's Greatest Animal Hits
1984   The Road
1987   Star portrait
1988   Wicked Man
1988   The Best of The Animals
1990   Very Best of Eric Burdon & The Animals, No. 36 in GER
1992   Good Times: A Collection
1994   Sings The Animals' Greatest Hits
1994   The Comeback Soundtrack (double album)
1995   Misunderstood
1995   Rare Masters Vol. 1
1996   Rare Masters Vol. 2
1996   The Best of Eric Burdon & War
1997   Soldier of Fortune
1997   The Best of The Animals
1997   The Animals' Greatest Hits
1999   F*** me... I thought he was Dead - Greatest Hits Alive
1999   Absolutely the Best
2001   San Franciscan Nights
2002   He Used to be an Animal
2003   Absolute Animals 1964–1968
2004   Gold: The Eric Burdon Story (double album)
2004   The Best of Eric Burdon
2005   It's My Life
2006   Wild & Wicked
2006   Tobacco Road
2007   The Hits
2007   I'm A Wicked Man
2008   Ultimate Rarities Vol. 1
2008   Ultimate Rarities Vol. 2

Singles

{| class="wikitable"
|-
! rowspan=2|  Year
! rowspan=2| Title
! colspan=11 | Chart positions
|-
!style="width:2em;font-size:75%"|UK
!style="width:2em;font-size:75%"|UK Indie
!style="width:2em;font-size:75%"|US
!style="width:2em;font-size:75%"|US Main. Rock
!style="width:2em;font-size:75%"|AUS
!style="width:2em;font-size:75%"|GRE
!style="width:2em;font-size:75%"|CAN
!style="width:2em;font-size:75%"|GER
!style="width:2em;font-size:75%"|NLD
!style="width:2em;font-size:75%"|AUT
!style="width:2em;font-size:75%"|SWE
|-
| 1966
|"Help Me Girl"
| style="text-align:center;"| 14
| style="text-align:center;"| —
| style="text-align:center;"| 29
| style="text-align:center;"| —
| style="text-align:center;"| 17
| style="text-align:center;"| —
| style="text-align:center;"| 33
| style="text-align:center;"| —
| style="text-align:center;"| —
| style="text-align:center;"| —
| style="text-align:center;"| —
|-
| rowspan=5 | 1967
|"When I Was Young"
| style="text-align:center;"| 40
| style="text-align:center;"| —
| style="text-align:center;"| 15
| style="text-align:center;"| —
| style="text-align:center;"| 2
| style="text-align:center;"| —
| style="text-align:center;"| —
| style="text-align:center;"| 31
| style="text-align:center;"| 7
| style="text-align:center;"| —
| style="text-align:center;"| —
|-
|"San Franciscan Nights"
| style="text-align:center;"| 7
| style="text-align:center;"| —
| style="text-align:center;"| 9
| style="text-align:center;"| —
| style="text-align:center;"| 5
| style="text-align:center;"| —
| style="text-align:center;"| 1
| style="text-align:center;"| 20
| style="text-align:center;"| 6
| style="text-align:center;"| —
| style="text-align:center;"| —
|-
|"Good Times"
| style="text-align:center;"| 20
| style="text-align:center;"| —
| style="text-align:center;"| —
| style="text-align:center;"| —
| style="text-align:center;"| —
| style="text-align:center;"| —
| style="text-align:center;"| —
| style="text-align:center;"| —
| style="text-align:center;"| —
| style="text-align:center;"| —
| style="text-align:center;"| —
|-
|"Monterey"
| style="text-align:center;"| —
| style="text-align:center;"| —
| style="text-align:center;"| 15
| style="text-align:center;"| —
| style="text-align:center;"| 4
| style="text-align:center;"| —
| style="text-align:center;"|3
| style="text-align:center;"| —
| style="text-align:center;"|35
| style="text-align:center;"| —
| style="text-align:center;"|17
|-
|"Anything"
| style="text-align:center;"| —
| style="text-align:center;"| —
| style="text-align:center;"| 80
| style="text-align:center;"| —
| style="text-align:center;"| —
| style="text-align:center;"| —
| style="text-align:center;"| —
| style="text-align:center;"| —
| style="text-align:center;"| —
| style="text-align:center;"| —
| style="text-align:center;"| —
|-
| rowspan=3 | 1968
|"Sky Pilot"
| style="text-align:center;"| 40
| style="text-align:center;"| —
| style="text-align:center;"| 14
| style="text-align:center;"| —
| style="text-align:center;"| 9
| style="text-align:center;"| —
| style="text-align:center;"| 7
| style="text-align:center;"| —
| style="text-align:center;"| —
| style="text-align:center;"| —
| style="text-align:center;"| —
|-
|"White Houses"/"River Deep – Mountain High"
| style="text-align:center;"| —
| style="text-align:center;"| —
| style="text-align:center;"| 67
| style="text-align:center;"| —
| style="text-align:center;"| —
| style="text-align:center;"| —
| style="text-align:center;"| —
| style="text-align:center;"| —
| style="text-align:center;"| 10
| style="text-align:center;"| —
| style="text-align:center;"| —
|-
|"Year of the Guru"
| style="text-align:center;"| —
| style="text-align:center;"| —
| style="text-align:center;"| —
| style="text-align:center;"| —
| style="text-align:center;"| —
| style="text-align:center;"| —
| style="text-align:center;"| —
| style="text-align:center;"| —
| style="text-align:center;"| —
| style="text-align:center;"| —
| style="text-align:center;"| —
|-
| 1969
|"Ring of Fire"
| style="text-align:center;"| 35
| style="text-align:center;"| —
| style="text-align:center;"| —
| style="text-align:center;"| —
| style="text-align:center;"| 10
| style="text-align:center;"| —
| style="text-align:center;"| —
| style="text-align:center;"| 19
| style="text-align:center;"| 4
| style="text-align:center;"| 8
| style="text-align:center;"| —
|-
| rowspan=2 | 1970
|"Spill the Wine"
| style="text-align:center;"| —
| style="text-align:center;"| —
| style="text-align:center;"| 3
| style="text-align:center;"| 2
| style="text-align:center;"| 3
| style="text-align:center;"| —
| style="text-align:center;"| 4
| style="text-align:center;"| 28
| style="text-align:center;"| 9
| style="text-align:center;"| —
| style="text-align:center;"| —
|-
|"Tobacco Road"'| style="text-align:center;"| —
| style="text-align:center;"| —
| style="text-align:center;"| —
| style="text-align:center;"| —
| style="text-align:center;"| —
| style="text-align:center;"| —
| style="text-align:center;"| —
| style="text-align:center;"| —
| style="text-align:center;"| —
| style="text-align:center;"| —
| style="text-align:center;"| —
|-
| rowspan=4 | 1971
|"They Can't Take Away Our Music"
| style="text-align:center;"| —
| style="text-align:center;"| —
| style="text-align:center;"| 50
| style="text-align:center;"| —
| style="text-align:center;"| —
| style="text-align:center;"| —
| style="text-align:center;"| 35
| style="text-align:center;"| —
| style="text-align:center;"| —
| style="text-align:center;"| —
| style="text-align:center;"| —
|-
|"Home Cookin'"
| style="text-align:center;"| —
| style="text-align:center;"| —
| style="text-align:center;"| 108
| style="text-align:center;"| —
| style="text-align:center;"| —
| style="text-align:center;"| —
| style="text-align:center;"| —
| style="text-align:center;"| —
| style="text-align:center;"| —
| style="text-align:center;"| —
| style="text-align:center;"| —
|-
|"Paint It, Black"
| style="text-align:center;"| —
| style="text-align:center;"| —
| style="text-align:center;"| —
| style="text-align:center;"| —
| style="text-align:center;"| —
| style="text-align:center;"| —
| style="text-align:center;"| —
| style="text-align:center;"| —
| style="text-align:center;"| 31
| style="text-align:center;"| —
| style="text-align:center;"| —
|-
|"Soledad" 
| style="text-align:center;"| —
| style="text-align:center;"| —
| style="text-align:center;"| —
| style="text-align:center;"| —
| style="text-align:center;"| —
| style="text-align:center;"| —
| style="text-align:center;"| —
| style="text-align:center;"| —
| style="text-align:center;"| —
| style="text-align:center;"| —
| style="text-align:center;"| —
|-
| rowspan=2 | 1974
|"The Real Me"
| style="text-align:center;"| —
| style="text-align:center;"| —
| style="text-align:center;"| —
| style="text-align:center;"| —
| style="text-align:center;"| —
| style="text-align:center;"| —
| style="text-align:center;"| —
| style="text-align:center;"| —
| style="text-align:center;"| —
| style="text-align:center;"| —
| style="text-align:center;"| —
|-
|"Ring of Fire"
| style="text-align:center;"| —
| style="text-align:center;"| —
| style="text-align:center;"| —
| style="text-align:center;"| —
| style="text-align:center;"| —
| style="text-align:center;"| —
| style="text-align:center;"| —
| style="text-align:center;"| —
| style="text-align:center;"| —
| style="text-align:center;"| —
| style="text-align:center;"| —
|-
| 1976
|"Magic Mountain"
| style="text-align:center;"| —
| style="text-align:center;"| —
| style="text-align:center;"| —
| style="text-align:center;"| —
| style="text-align:center;"| —
| style="text-align:center;"| —
| style="text-align:center;"| —
| style="text-align:center;"| —
| style="text-align:center;"| —
| style="text-align:center;"| —
| style="text-align:center;"| —
|-
| rowspan=3 | 1977
|"Fire on the Sun"
| style="text-align:center;"| —
| style="text-align:center;"| —
| style="text-align:center;"| —
| style="text-align:center;"| —
| style="text-align:center;"| —
| style="text-align:center;"| —
| style="text-align:center;"| —
| style="text-align:center;"| —
| style="text-align:center;"| —
| style="text-align:center;"| —
| style="text-align:center;"| —
|-
|"Please Send Me Someone to Love"
| style="text-align:center;"| —
| style="text-align:center;"| —
| style="text-align:center;"| —
| style="text-align:center;"| —
| style="text-align:center;"| —
| style="text-align:center;"| —
| style="text-align:center;"| —
| style="text-align:center;"| —
| style="text-align:center;"| —
| style="text-align:center;"| —
| style="text-align:center;"| —
|-
|"Woman of the Rings"
| style="text-align:center;"| —
| style="text-align:center;"| —
| style="text-align:center;"| —
| style="text-align:center;"| —
| style="text-align:center;"| —
| style="text-align:center;"| 10
| style="text-align:center;"| —
| style="text-align:center;"| —
| style="text-align:center;"| —
| style="text-align:center;"| —
| style="text-align:center;"| —
|-
| 1980
|"Power Company"
| style="text-align:center;"| —
| style="text-align:center;"| —
| style="text-align:center;"| —
| style="text-align:center;"| —
| style="text-align:center;"| —
| style="text-align:center;"| —
| style="text-align:center;"| —
| style="text-align:center;"| —
| style="text-align:center;"| —
| style="text-align:center;"| 15
| style="text-align:center;"| —
|-
| rowspan=2 | 1982
|"Bird on the Beach"
| style="text-align:center;"| —
| style="text-align:center;"| —
| style="text-align:center;"| —
| style="text-align:center;"| —
| style="text-align:center;"| —
| style="text-align:center;"| —
| style="text-align:center;"| —
| style="text-align:center;"| —
| style="text-align:center;"| —
| style="text-align:center;"| —
| style="text-align:center;"| —
|-
|"Take It Easy"
| style="text-align:center;"| —
| style="text-align:center;"| —
| style="text-align:center;"| —
| style="text-align:center;"| —
| style="text-align:center;"| —
| style="text-align:center;"| —
| style="text-align:center;"| —
| style="text-align:center;"| —
| style="text-align:center;"| —
| style="text-align:center;"| —
| style="text-align:center;"| —
|-
| rowspan=6 | 1988
|"Run for Your Life"
| style="text-align:center;"| —
| style="text-align:center;"| —
| style="text-align:center;"| —
| style="text-align:center;"| —
| style="text-align:center;"| —
| style="text-align:center;"| —
| style="text-align:center;"| —
| style="text-align:center;"| —
| style="text-align:center;"| —
| style="text-align:center;"| —
| style="text-align:center;"| —
|-
|"Don't Give a Damn"
| style="text-align:center;"| —
| style="text-align:center;"| —
| style="text-align:center;"| —
| style="text-align:center;"| —
| style="text-align:center;"| —
| style="text-align:center;"| —
| style="text-align:center;"| —
| style="text-align:center;"| —
| style="text-align:center;"| —
| style="text-align:center;"| —
| style="text-align:center;"| —
|-
|"I Used to Be an Animal"
| style="text-align:center;"| —
| style="text-align:center;"| —
| style="text-align:center;"| —
| style="text-align:center;"| —
| style="text-align:center;"| —
| style="text-align:center;"| —
| style="text-align:center;"| —
| style="text-align:center;"| —
| style="text-align:center;"| —
| style="text-align:center;"| —
| style="text-align:center;"| —
|-
|"Going Back to Memphis"
| style="text-align:center;"| —
| style="text-align:center;"| —
| style="text-align:center;"| —
| style="text-align:center;"| —
| style="text-align:center;"| —
| style="text-align:center;"| —
| style="text-align:center;"| —
| style="text-align:center;"| —
| style="text-align:center;"| —
| style="text-align:center;"| —
| style="text-align:center;"| —
|-
|"I Will Be with You Again"
| style="text-align:center;"| —
| style="text-align:center;"| —
| style="text-align:center;"| —
| style="text-align:center;"| —
| style="text-align:center;"| —
| style="text-align:center;"| —
| style="text-align:center;"| —
| style="text-align:center;"| —
| style="text-align:center;"| —
| style="text-align:center;"| —
| style="text-align:center;"| —
|-
|"Good Times"
| style="text-align:center;"| —
| style="text-align:center;"| —
| style="text-align:center;"| —
| style="text-align:center;"| —
| style="text-align:center;"| —
| style="text-align:center;"| —
| style="text-align:center;"| —
| style="text-align:center;"| 53
| style="text-align:center;"| —
| style="text-align:center;"| —
| style="text-align:center;"| —
|-
| rowspan=3 | 1990
|"Sixteen Tons"
| style="text-align:center;"| —
| style="text-align:center;"| —
| style="text-align:center;"| —
| style="text-align:center;"| —
| style="text-align:center;"| —
| style="text-align:center;"| —
| style="text-align:center;"| —
| style="text-align:center;"| —
| style="text-align:center;"| —
| style="text-align:center;"| —
| style="text-align:center;"| —
|-
|"We Gotta Get out of This Place" 
| style="text-align:center;"| —
| style="text-align:center;"| 85
| style="text-align:center;"| —
| style="text-align:center;"| —
| style="text-align:center;"| —
| style="text-align:center;"| —
| style="text-align:center;"| —
| style="text-align:center;"| —
| style="text-align:center;"| —
| style="text-align:center;"| —
| style="text-align:center;"| —
|-
|"No Man's Land" 
| style="text-align:center;"| —
| style="text-align:center;"| —
| style="text-align:center;"| —
| style="text-align:center;"| —
| style="text-align:center;"| —
| style="text-align:center;"| —
| style="text-align:center;"| —
| style="text-align:center;"| —
| style="text-align:center;"| —
| style="text-align:center;"| —
| style="text-align:center;"| —
|-
| 2004
|"Once upon a Time"
| style="text-align:center;"| —
| style="text-align:center;"| —
| style="text-align:center;"| —
| style="text-align:center;"| —
| style="text-align:center;"| —
| style="text-align:center;"| —
| style="text-align:center;"| —
| style="text-align:center;"| —
| style="text-align:center;"| —
| style="text-align:center;"| —
| style="text-align:center;"| —
|-
| 2008
|"For What It's Worth" 
| style="text-align:center;"| —
| style="text-align:center;"| —
| style="text-align:center;"| —
| style="text-align:center;"| —
| style="text-align:center;"| —
| style="text-align:center;"| —
| style="text-align:center;"| —
| style="text-align:center;"| —
| style="text-align:center;"| —
| style="text-align:center;"| —
| style="text-align:center;"| —
|-
| colspan="15" style="text-align:center; font-size:8pt;"| "—" denotes releases that did not chart.
|}

 Collaborations 
"Verdammt wir müssen raus aus dem Dreck" and "Hoochie Coochie Man" on the live album Livehaftig by Udo Lindenberg in 1979.
"Room with a View" on the album Coast to Coast by Paul Shaffer in 1989.
"No Man's Land" with Tony Carey and Anne Haigis on Carey's album For You in 1989.
"We Gotta Get out of This Place" with Katrina & The Waves for the TV series China Beach in 1990.
"I'm Your Man" on the Mark Craney benefit album Something with a Pulse! in 1996.
"Another Brick in the Wall" on the cover album British Rock Symphony with the British Rock Symphony Orchestra in 1999.
"Power to the People" on the soundtrack album Steal This Movie! with Billy Preston on vocals and Ringo Starr on drums in 2000.
"I Don't Live Today" and "Third Stone from the Sun/The Story of Life" on the Jimi Hendrix tribute album Blue Haze in 2000.
"Someone Wrote 'Save me' On a Wall" on the album Joyous in the City of Lunatics (Χαρούμενοι στην πόλη των τρελλών) by Pyx Lax (Πυξ Λαξ) in 2003.
"The House of the Rising Sun" and "Imagine" on the live compilation album Legends of Rock by Man Doki Soulmates in 2004.
"For What It's Worth" with Carl Carlton and Max Buskohl on the album Songs for the Lost and Brave in 2008.
"More Live to Live" on the album Aquarelle by Leslie Mándoki in 2009.

Concert films
1964: Live at Wembley1973: Rock Concert (TV performance)
1976: Live at Rockpalast1976: Live in Montreux (bootleg)
1982: Live at Rockpalast, Loreley (bootleg)
1983: Live at the Royal Albert Hall 1983 (bootleg)
1991: Live in Baden Baden (bootleg)
1991: Live in Tokyo (bootleg)
1991: Finally... Eric Burdon & The Animals (documentary)
1999: Live at the Coach House2000: The Eric Burdon Band Live2001: The British Invasion Returns (various artists)
2003: Yes, You Can Go Home2004: Live at Rockpalast (TV broadcast)
2005: Live at San Sebastian2006: Live at the Lugano Jazz Festival2008: Live at the Ventura Beach California (with Robby Krieger and Friends)

 Video Clips 

 "Baby Let Me Take You Home" (1964)
 "House of the Rising Sun" (1965)
 "Don't Let Me Be Misunderstood" (1965)
 "When I Was Young" (1967)
 "San Franciscan Nights" (1967)
 "Monterey" (2 videos) (1968)
 "Poem by the Sea" (1968) (not broadcast)
 "Hollywood Woman" (1977) (not broadcast)
 "Tomb of the Unknown Singer" (1977) (not broadcast)
 "The Night" (1983)
 "Run For Your Life" (1989) (not broadcast)
 "We Gotta Get Out of This Place" (1990)
 "Sixteen Tons" (1990)
 "Once Upon A Time" (2005) (not broadcast)
 "The Secret" (2005) (not broadcast)
 "Highway 62" (2005) (not broadcast)
 "Devil Run" (2006) (not broadcast)

Bootlegs
 Live at Olympia Stadium '64 '65 '66, Paris The Deluxe BBC Files Live at the Marquee Club 1967 Ultimate Live Rarities 1965 - 68 (3CD set) Live at Ronnie Scott's 17.09 - 1970 (with War & Jimi Hendrix)
 Live at Offenbach, January 1971, Germany (with War)
 Live at Frost Amphitheatre, Palo Alto, 28 April 1971 (with War)
 Live at the Whiskey, L.A. 1971 (with Jimmy Witherspoon)
 Live in Homburg 1973 When I Was Young at Denver 1974 New York City 1975 (radio broadcast)
 Rockpalast 1976 (TV broadcast)
 Sartory Saal, Köln 1978 Live in Holland 1978/79 (radio broadcast)
 Live at Vienna's first open air festival 1980 (with Fire Department)
 Live in Reggio, Milano, Italy 1980 (with Fire Department & Louisiana Red)
 Live at Frankfurt Jazz Festival 1980 (with Fire Department)
 Live at Rockpalast, Loreley 1982 (CD and DVD/VHS) (including a Jam session)
 Live at the Canary Club 1982 Live in Poughkeepsie 1983 (with The Animals) (radio broadcast)
 Universal City 1983 (with The Animals)
 Live at the Royal Oak Theatre 1983 (with The Animals)
 Demos 1977 - 1983 (with The Animals)
 Rarest Masters (2CD) Rare Masters vol. 1 Rare Masters vol. 2 Live in Sevilla 1984 Live at Westbury Music Fair 1986 Live at Westfalenhalle Dortmund 1986 Live at Capitol Mannheim 1986 Unreleased Project #2 Unreleased Project #3 Unreleased Project #4 Unreleased Masters and Alternative Takes Searching for a Brand New Day Live in Bremen 1988 Live at San Diego Street Scene (with Robby Krieger)
 1990 Detroit Tapes (with Robby Krieger)
 Live at the Caravan of Dreams (with Robby Krieger)
 Live at the Waters Club 1991 (with Brian Auger & Robby Krieger)
 Live in Cheiming, Germany 1992 (with Brian Auger Band)
 Live at Last Day Saloon San Francisco 1993 (with Brian Auger)
 Live at the Waterfront, Rockford 1995 Live at der Filharmoniehalle, Darmstadt, April 1995 Pasadena Live 1995 Live at Abensberg 1996 Live at Slims San Francisco 1998 Live in Warszawa 1998 (radio broadcast)
 Live in Baltimore 1999 Live at Studio 22, Australia, 2000 (radio broadcast)
 Live at Robin Two, Wolverhampton 2002 Live at Boarding House, Lowell 2002 Live at Waterfest Oshkosh Wisconsin 2003 Live in Harelbeke 2003 Live at Rockpalast, Kantine, Köln 2004 (TV broadcast)
 Live at the Jazz Cafè 2005 Live 27.01. 2006 Live at the Jazz Cafè 2006 Live in Paris France 2006 (radio broadcast)
 Live at the Royal Albert Hall April 2008 Live at Grand Prairie July 2008 Daffodil Festival 2008 Greek Theatre L.A. 2008 Live in Toronto 2008 Live in Philadelphia 2008 Live at Clearwater August 2008 Radar Festival 2009 Live at the Fabrik Hamburg 2009 Live at the Fairgrounds 2009''

Notes

References
 

Discography Burdon, Eric
Rock music discographies
Discographies of British artists